The Atlantic Coast Conference Men's Soccer Offensive Player of the Year is an annual award given to the best attacking player in the Atlantic Coast Conference during the NCAA Division I men's soccer season. Prior to 2004, the award had been known as the Men's Soccer Player of the Year, but in 2003 the award split into the Men's Offensive and Defensive Categories. The award has been given since 1970. Notable winners of the award include current and former professionals, Henry Gutierrez, Mike Fisher, Charlie Davies, Alejandro Bedoya, Kyle Martino and Jack Harrison. The ACC Men's Soccer Offensive Player of the Year award is currently held by Shakur Mohammed, who won the award as a sophomore with Duke, while the ACC Men's Soccer Defensive Player of the Year award is currently held by Andreas Ueland, who won the award as a Senior with Virginia.

Clyde Browne has won the award more times than any other player, winning it four times from 1972 until 1976.

Key

Winners

Player of the Year (1970–2003)

Offensive Player of the Year

Defensive Player of the Year

Midfielder of the Year

References

College soccer trophies and awards in the United States
Atlantic Coast
Player of the Year
Awards established in 1970
1970 establishments in the United States